Tol Air (Tol Air Services Inc.) was a charter and cargo airline based at Luis Muñoz Marín International Airport in San Juan, Puerto Rico. It was established in 1981 and started operations on 16 May 1983. It operated daily cargo charter flights from Puerto Rico to 10 destinations in the Caribbean. In April 2006, Tol Air was purchased by Four Star Air Cargo.

Code data
IATA Code: TI
ICAO Code: TOL
Callsign: Tol Air

Fleet
The Tol Air fleet consisted of the following aircraft:
 4 Beech E18S
 3 Cessna 402
 1 Cessna 208
 3 Convair 240
 2 Convair 440
 2 Douglas C-47 Skytrain
 5 Douglas DC-3
 1 Douglas C-54 Skymaster
 1 Martin 4-0-4
 1 Swearingen SA226-TC Metro II

Accidents and incidents
On 30 December 2003, Douglas DC-3C N781T was substantially damaged when the starboard undercarriage collapsed on landing at Cyril E. King Airport, Charlotte Amalie after a flight that originated at San Juan, Puerto Rico.

See also 
 List of defunct airlines of the United States

References

External links
Tol Air
Four Star Air Cargo

Defunct cargo airlines
Defunct airlines of Puerto Rico
Airlines established in 1983
Airlines disestablished in 2006
Airlines of Puerto Rico
1983 establishments in Puerto Rico
2006 disestablishments in Puerto Rico